Chengdu Shude High School (Simplified Chinese: 成都市树德中学, Traditional Chinese:  成都樹徳中學, pinyin: Chéngdu Shùdé Zhongxúe) is a public high school in Chengdu, Sichuan, China. It is commonly known as the Chengdu No. 9 High School (成都九中). The phrase shude in Mandarin translates to "cultivation of morals" and stems from the school's mission to cultivate morals and nurture the whole person. The school has been commended on multiple occasions by municipal and provincial authorities for achieving high average scores on the Gaokao, an important university-entrance exam.

History

In 1929, Sun Zhen (孫震), the deputy general of the 29th Brigade of the National Revolutionary Army of the Kuomintang founded the first Shude Voluntary School. Between 1929 and 1932, Sun Zhen founded four other Shude Primary Schools. Among the four Shude Primary Schools, one of them was later expanded to include a co-educational Middle School division. The boys' division was located at Hsi Lai Temple (西來寺) at Shude Lane (樹德里) on Lingxia Street (寧夏街), while the girls' division was located at Shude Alley (樹德巷) on Lingxia Street (寧夏街). 

In the Fall of 1937, with the donations from the then Governor of the Sichuan Province, Li Jieren and Chairman Chen of the Jialezi Company, the school was expanded to include a High School division. A school board was formed. Since then, Shude High School became a fully operating co-educational Secondary School. In 1943, the school was commended by Professor Yang Renpian, Professor at the Wuhan University, as one of the six best private secondary schools.

Following the establishment of the People's Republic of China, in 1950, the school was nationalized and renamed Chengdu No. 9 High School (成都九中) by the Chengdu People's Government. In 1953, the school was recognized as one of the three main secondary schools in Chengdu City. In the late 1950s, No. 9 High School of Chengdu served as the school for children of the cadres of the Communist Party of China in Chengdu and wider Sichuan Province, as well as a designated school for the children of returned Overseas Chinese. In 1980, Shude High School was honored as the first batch of exemplary schools in Sichuan Province.

In June 1988, the high school celebrated its 60th anniversary and reverted its name from Chengdu No. 9 High School to the current Shude High School due to the requests from Sun Zhen's eldest son, Sun Jingshan (孙静山) and alumni from all over the world. Sun Jingshan visited the school from Taiwan and donated to the school's library. 

In 2000, Shude High School was chosen as a model senior secondary school of China. In 2004, the school introduced the Victorian Certificate of Education (VCE) and became the first school in Sichuan Province to bring in an international curriculum. 

During 2007-2010, the school expanded and another two campuses were founded (Guanghua campus and Foreign language campus, respectively). In 2009, the Shude High School Educational Group was formed. Since then, it helped the development of 17 member schools. In 2011, the school introduced the International Baccalaureate Curriculum and became the first public high school to do so. In the same year, the school was commended by Peking University and Tsinghua University. In 2013, the school was chosen as a First-level model school of Sichuan Province. In 2019, school staff and alumni celebrated the 90th anniversary of the school at its foreign language campus.

Present

With an annual enrollment of 5,000 students at three different campuses, Shude High School attracts elite students from the Sichuan Province. Every year, in the National College Entrance Examination, the average score of Shude High School ranks as one of the highest in the Sichuan Province.

The basketball team of Shude High School had won the championship in Sichuan Middle School Basketball Cup from 2000 to 2005 and had won third place in Nike National Middle School Basketball Cup.

The International Department of Shude High School, jointly set up by Chengdu Shude High School and Chengdu Huaying Consulting and Service Ltd., was accredited by Chengdu Bureau of Education in 2002. (Verification No:(2005) 5). To date, the school offers the  Victorian Certificate of Education (VCE), the International Baccalaureate (IB) and the Advanced Placement (AP) Program.

Notable alumni
Liu Yongyan (刘永言), once China's richest man, Chairman of New Hope Group
Han Sanping (韩三平), the president of Beijing Film studio.
Zhao Ermi(赵尔宓), herpetologist, member of Chinese Academy of Sciences.
Sha Guohe(沙国河), physical chemist, member of the Chinese Academy of Sciences.
Hu Daiguang(胡代光), economist
Que Yongwu(阙永伍), the first head coach of China National Women's Volleyball Team

Shude schools in Chengdu

Chengdu Shude Union School (成都树德联合中学)
Chengdu Shude Experimental Middle School (成都树德实验中学)
International Department of Shude High School (树德中学国际部)

Sister schools
Central High School (Phoenix, Arizona, United States)
Hellgate High School (Missoula, Montana, United States)
Sheffield High School (Sheffield, United Kingdom)
Haileybury College (Melbourne, Victoria, Australia)
The Knox School (Melbourne, Victoria, Australia)

References

External links
Chengdu Shude High School
Chengdu Shude Experimental Middle School
Chengdu Shude Union School
Chengdu Bureau of Education

High schools in Chengdu
Educational institutions established in 1929
1929 establishments in China